On September 14, 2013, Jonathan Ferrell (born October 11, 1988), a 24-year-old former college football player for the Florida A&M University Rattlers sought help after a car crash. When police arrived, he ran towards them and was killed by police officer Randall "Wes" Kerrick in Charlotte, North Carolina. Kerrick was charged with voluntary manslaughter, but not convicted. Police dashcam footage of the incident was released to the public.

Shooting
Ferrell, an African American, was unarmed at the time he was shot. While giving a co-worker a lift home on the night of September 14, 2013, he crashed his car, went to a house in the Bradfield Farms neighborhood and knocked on the door. The resident, Sarah McCartney, called the police and three officers came. Ferrell then ran towards them, whereupon one of the officers fired a taser at Ferrell and missed. That same officer, Officer Thornel Little, testified that Ferrell had said "shoot me" twice as he ran up on the officers. Kerrick then opened fire on Ferrell, shooting him twelve times and killing him.

A toxicology test of Ferrell's blood showed a blood alcohol level within the legal limit for driving.

Legal proceedings
The day following the shooting, Officer Randall "Wes" Kerrick was charged with voluntary manslaughter, and was released on $45,000 bail from jail. On January 21, 2014, a grand jury declined to indict Kerrick with voluntary manslaughter. On January 27, a second grand jury did indict Kerrick on a voluntary manslaughter charge. On August 21, 2015, a 26th District judge declared a mistrial in the case after the jury reached a deadlock, with eight jurors on one side and four on the other. The Attorney General of North Carolina, Roy Cooper, said that the state would not re-try Kerrick.

On May 14, 2015, the city of Charlotte settled a separate lawsuit with Ferrell's family for $2.25 million.

Reaction
Ferrell's cousin, Morris A. Young (Sheriff of Gadsden County, Florida), said of the incident that Ferrell had always been on the right track and was only looking for help after getting into a traffic collision late at night, yet "the next thing you know, law enforcement comes and sees a young black male at night in that neighborhood. And sometimes people react to that."

On August 21, 2015, after the mistrial declaration, protesters took to the streets of Charlotte. Several areas of the city were shut down as a result, and two people were arrested.

On October 2, 2015, Kerrick resigned from the police force.

See also
 Shooting of Keith Lamont Scott

References

Deaths by firearm in North Carolina
Protests in the United States
History of Charlotte, North Carolina
2013 in North Carolina
Black Lives Matter
September 2013 events in the United States
African Americans shot dead by law enforcement officers in the United States
Law enforcement in North Carolina